Freek Show is the second studio album by American hip-hop duo Twiztid. Released on October 31, 2000, the album peaked at #51 on the Billboard 200.

Music
Freek Show is a horrorcore and rap metal album which incorporates elements of other genres into its sound, including techno and pop. "People Are Strange" is a cover of the 1967 single by the Doors from its Strange Days album.

Reception

In his review of the album, AllMusic's Brad Mills wrote that "this kind of music appeals to a small sector of hip-hop listeners and will probably do well within [its] niche market, but the average hip-hop listener will just have to understand that this is a different kind of album." Exclaim! reviewer Thomas Quinlan wrote, "Freek Show is not as good as Twiztid's Mostatesteless debut, but their second outing is a good attempt to match it". In 2014, Rolling Stone writer Nick Murray described "We Don't Die" as "one of turn-of-the-millenium rap-metal’s best tunes".

Release
The album was released on October 31, 2000, which coincided with Insane Clown Posse's Bizaar/Bizzar albums. The album charted at 51 on the Billboard 200, making it their first to crack the Billboard top 100. On July 6, 2015, it was announced that Twiztid will be performing the entire album at a spot show in Philadelphia, Pennsylvania. On July 16, 2015, it was announced that the 15 Year Freek Show Anniversary Show will be held on October 21, 2015.

Twiztid also announced two more releases of Freek Show, the first being Freek Show: The 15th Anniversary Edition. This version is a Tour Exclusive sold at shows with a very limited pressing. The other announced release was a 12-inch colored double vinyl (also a limited pressing with only 1,000 to be pressed), which will see release on March 18, 2016.

2021 Twiztid released a limited edition (limited to 1,000 copies) 20 Year Anniversary CD for Freek Show called Freek Show: Disturbed & Unheard, released under Magic Ninja Entertainment

Tracklist 
1. FS-20

2. Track 8 (Feat. Legz Diamond)

3. All 2gether

4. Leave Me Alone (Toilet $ Mix)

5. Bad Luck Magnet (Feat. Blaze Ya Dead Homie)

6. Bagz (Vampirate Mix)

Music videos
The first music video was "We Don't Die", which was also released as a single.

Track listing

Charts

References 

2000 albums
Island Records albums
Twiztid albums
Psychopathic Records albums